NAPT may refer to 

 Network Address and Port Translation, the most common type of network address translation
 NAPT (electronic music artist), English breakbeat duo
 Native American Public Telecommunications
 North American Poker Tour, a series of televised poker tournaments
 Needs assessment and planning tools
 The Navy Advanced Placement Test, used to select applicants to the US Navy nuclear program